Tănătari is a village in Căușeni District, Moldova.

Notable people
 Pantelimon Erhan

References

Villages of Căușeni District
Bendersky Uyezd